Ronald Lee Ferrari (born July 30, 1959) is a former professional American football player who played linebacker for five seasons for the San Francisco 49ers.

1959 births
Living people
American football linebackers
Illinois Fighting Illini football players
Lakeland Muskies football players
San Francisco 49ers players
Sportspeople from Springfield, Illinois
Players of American football from Illinois